The Tabor District is a city district of the City Municipality of Maribor in northeastern Slovenia. In 2017, the district had a population of 10,632.

The local football club is called NK Maribor Tabor, which play their home matches at the Tabor Sports Park. Tabor is home of the Tabor Hall, the biggest indoor hall in the city, and the Tabor Ice Hall.

References

Districts of the City Municipality of Maribor